This is a list of schools in Derbyshire, England.

State-funded schools

Primary schools

 Abercrombie Primary School, Chesterfield
 Aldercar Infant School, Aldercar
 All Saints' CE Infants School, Matlock
 All Saints' CE Junior School, Matlock
 All Saints RC Voluntary Academy, Old Glossop
 Ambergate Primary School, Ambergate
 Anthony Bek Community Primary School, Pleasley
 Arkwright Primary School, Arkwright Town
 Ashbourne Hilltop Primary School, Ashbourne
 Ashbourne Primary School, Ashbourne
 Ashbrook Infant School, Borrowash
 Ashbrook Junior School, Borrowash
 Ashover Primary School, Ashover
 Aston-on-Trent Primary School, Aston-on-Trent
 Bakewell CE Infant School, Bakewell
 Bakewell Methodist Junior School, Bakewell
 Bamford Primary School, Bamford
 Barlborough Primary School, Barlborough
 Barlow CE Primary School, Barlow
 Barrow Hill Primary Academy, Barrow Hill
 Belmont Primary School, Swadlincote
 Biggin CE Primary School, Biggin
 Birk Hill Infant School, Eckington
 Bishop Pursglove CE Primary School, Buxton
 Blackwell Community Primary School, Blackwell
 Bolsover CE Junior School, Bolsover
 Bolsover Infant School, Bolsover
 Bonsall CE Primary School, Bonsall
 Bradley CE Primary School, Bradley
 Bradwell CE Infant School, Bradwell
 Bradwell Junior School, Bradwell
 Brailsford CE Primary School, Brailsford
 Bramley Vale Primary School, Bramley Vale
 Brampton Primary School, Brampton
 Brassington Primary School, Brassington
 Breadsall CE Primary School, Breadsall
 The Brigg Infant School, South Normanton
 Brimington Junior School, Brimington
 Brimington Manor Infant School, Brimington
 Brockley Primary School, Shuttlewood
 Brockwell Junior School, Loundsley Green
 Brockwell Nursery School, Loundsley Green
 Brookfield Primary School, Langwith Junction
 Brooklands Primary School, Long Eaton
 Burbage Primary School, Burbage
 Buxton Infant School, Buxton
 Buxton Junior School, Buxton
 Buxworth Primary School, Buxworth
 Calow CE Primary School, Calow
 Camms CE Primary School, Eckington
 Carsington and Hopton Primary School, Carsington
 Castle View Primary School, Matlock
 Castleton CE Primary School, Castleton
 Cavendish Junior School, Newbold Moor
 Chapel-en-le-Frith CE Primary School, Chapel-en-le-Frith
 Charlesworth Primary School, Charlesworth
 Charlotte Infant School, Ilkeston
 Chaucer Infant School, Ilkeston
 Chaucer Junior School, Ilkeston
 Chellaston Fields Spencer Academy, Chellaston
 Chinley Primary School, Chinley
 Christ Church CE Primary School, Stonegravels
 Christ the King RC Academy, Alfreton
 Church Broughton CE Primary School, Church Broughton
 Church Gresley Infant School, Church Gresley
 Clifton CE Primary School, Clifton
 Clover Leys Spencer Academy, Chellaston
 Cloudside Academy, Sandiacre
 Clowne Infant School, Clowne
 Clowne Junior School, Clowne
 Codnor Community CE Primary School, Codnor
 Combs Infant School, Chapel-en-le-Frith
 Coppice Primary School, Marlpool
 Copthorne Community Infant School, Alfreton
 Corfield CE Infant School, Heanor
 Cotmanhay Infant School, Cotmanhay
 Cotmanhay Junior School, Cotmanhay
 Coton-in-the-Elms CE Primary School, Coton-in-the-Elms
 Creswell CE Infant School, Creswell
 Creswell Junior School, Creswell
 Crich Carr CE Primary School, Whatstandwell
 Crich CE Infant School, Crich
 Crich Junior School, Crich
 Croft Infant School, Alfreton
 Cromford CE Primary School, Cromford
 Curbar Primary School, Calver
 The Curzon CE Primary School, Quarndon
 Cutthorpe Primary School, Cutthorpe
 Dallimore Primary School, Kirk Hallam
 Darley Churchtown CE Primary School, Darley Dale
 Darley Dale Primary School, Hackney
 Deer Park Primary School, Wingerworth
 Denby Free CE Primary School, Denby
 Dinting CE Primary School, Dinting Vale
 Dove Holes CE Primary School, Dove Holes
 Dovedale Primary School, Long Eaton
 Doveridge Primary School, Doveridge
 Draycott Community Primary School, Draycott
 Dronfield Infant School, Dronfield
 Dronfield Junior School, Dronfield
 Dronfield Stonelow Junior School, Dronfield
 Duckmanton Primary School, Duckmanton
 Duffield the Meadows Primary School, Duffield
 Duke of Norfolk CE Primary School, Glossop
 Dunston Primary Academy, Newbold
 Earl Sterndale CE Primary School, Earl Sterndale
 Eckington Junior School, Eckington
 Edale CE Primary School, Edale
 Egginton Primary School, Egginton
 Elmsleigh Infant School, Swadlincote
 Elton CE Primary School, Elton
 English Martyrs' RC Academy, Long Eaton
 Etwall Primary School, Etwall
 Eureka Primary School, Midway
 Eyam CE Primary School, Eyam
 Fairfield CE Junior School, Fairfield
 Fairfield Infant School, Fairfield
 Fairmeadows Foundation Primary School, Newhall
 Field House Infant School, Ilkeston
 Findern Primary School, Findern
 Firfield Primary School, Breaston
 Fitzherbert CE Primary School, Fenny Bentley
 Fritchley CE Primary School, Fritchley
 Furness Vale Primary School, Furness Vale
 Gamesley Primary School, Gamesley
 Gilbert Heathcote Infant School, Whittington Moor
 Glebe Junior School, South Normanton
 Gorseybrigg Primary School, Dronfield Woodhouse
 Granby Junior School, Ilkeston
 Grange Primary School, Ilkeston
 Grassmoor Primary School, Grassmoor
 Great Hucklow CE Primary School, Great Hucklow
 The Green Infant School, South Normanton
 Grindleford Primary School, Grindleford
 Hadfield Infant School, Hadfield
 Hady Primary School, Hady
 Hague Bar Primary School, Hague Bar
 Hallam Fields Junior School, Ilkeston
 Harpur Hill Primary School, Harpur Hill
 Harrington Junior School, Long Eaton
 Hartington CE Primary School, Hartington
 Hartshorne CE Primary School, Hartshorne
 Hasland Infant School, Hasland
 Hasland Junior School, Hasland
 Hathersage St Michael's CE Primary School, Hathersage
 Hayfield Primary School, Hayfield
 Heage Primary School, Heage
 Heath Fields Primary School, Hatton
 Heath Primary School, Heath
 Henry Bradley Infant School, Brimington
 Herbert Strutt Primary School, Belper
 Highfield Hall Primary School, Chesterfield
 Highfields Spencer Academy, Highfield
 Hilton Primary School, Hilton
 Hodthorpe Primary School, Hodthorpe
 Holbrook CE Primary School, Holbrook
 Hollingwood Primary School, Hollingwood
 Holme Hall Primary School, Chesterfield
 Holmesdale Infant School, Dronfield
 Holmgate Primary School, Clay Cross
 Hope Primary School, Hope
 Horsley CE Primary School, Horsley
 Horsley Woodhouse Primary School, Horsley Woodhouse
 Howitt Primary Community School, Heanor
 Hulland CE Primary School, Hulland
 Hunloke Park Primary School, Wingerworth
 Immaculate Conception RC Primary, Spinkhill
 Inkersall Primary Academy, Inkersall
 Ironville and Codnor Primary School, Ironville
 John King Infant Academy, Pinxton
 Kensington Junior School, Ilkeston
 Kilburn Infant School, Kilburn
 Kilburn Junior School, Kilburn
 Killamarsh Infant School, Killamarsh
 Killamarsh Junior School, Killamarsh
 Kirk Ireton CE Primary School, Kirk Ireton
 Kirk Langley CE Primary School, Kirk Langley
 Kirkstead Junior Academy, Pinxton
 Kniveton CE Primary School, Kniveton
 Laceyfields Academy, Langley
 Ladycross Infant School, Sandiacre
 Ladywood Primary School, Kirk Hallam
 Langley Mill Academy, Langley Mill
 Langley Mill CE Infant School, Langley Mill
 Langwith Bassett Junior Academy, Upper Langwith
 Larklands Infant School, Ilkeston
 Lea Primary School, Lea
 Lenthall Infant School, Dronfield
 Leys Junior School, Alfreton
 Linton Primary School, Linton
 Little Eaton Primary School, Little Eaton
 Litton CE Primary School, Litton
 Long Lane CE Primary School, Dalbury Lees
 Long Row Primary School, Belper
 Longford CE Primary School, Longford
 Longmoor Primary School, Long Eaton
 Longstone CE Primary School, Great Longstone
 Longwood Infant Academy, Pinxton
 Lons Infant School, Ripley
 Loscoe CE Primary School, Loscoe
 Mapperley CE Primary School, Mapperley
 Marlpool Infant School, Marlpool
 Marlpool Junior School, Marlpool
 Marsh Lane Primary School, Marsh Lane
 Marston Montgomery Primary School, Marston Montgomery
 Mary Swanwick Primary School, Old Whittington
 Matlock Bath Holy Trinity CE Primary School, Matlock Bath
 The Mease Spencer Academy, Hilton
 Melbourne Infant School, Melbourne
 Melbourne Junior School, Melbourne
 Mickley Infant School, Stretton
 Middleton Community Primary School, Middleton-by-Wirksworth
 Milford Primary School, Milford
 Model Village Primary School, Shirebrook
 Monyash CofE Primary School, Monyash
 Morley Primary School, Morley
 Morton Primary School, Morton
 Mugginton CE Primary School, Mugginton
 Mundy CE Junior School, Heanor
 Netherseal St Peter's CE Primary School, Netherseal
 New Bolsover Primary  School, Bolsover
 New Mills Primary School, New Mills
 New Whittington Community Primary School, New Whittington
 Newbold CE Primary School, Newbold
 Newhall Community Junior School, Newhall
 Newhall Infant School, Newhall
 Newton Primary School, Newton
 Newton Solney CE Infant School, Newton Solney
 Newtown Primary School, New Mills
 Norbriggs Primary School, Mastin Moor
 Norbury CE Primary School, Norbury
 North Wingfield Primary Academy, North Wingfield
 Northfield Junior School, Dronfield
 Old Hall Junior School, Chesterfield
 Osmaston CE Primary School, Osmaston
 Overseal Primary School, Overseal
 Padfield Community Primary School, Padfield
 Palterton Primary School, Palterton
 Park House Primary School, Lower Pilsley
 The Park Infant School, Shirebrook
 The Park Junior School, Shirebrook
 Parklands Infant School, Long Eaton
 Parwich Primary School, Parwich
 Peak Dale Primary School, Peak Dale
 Peak Forest CE Primary School, Peak Forest
 Pennine Way Junior Academy, Swadlincote
 Penny Acres Primary School, Holmesfield
 Pilsley CE Primary School, Pilsley Village
 Pilsley Primary School, Pilsley
 Poolsbrook Primary Academy, Poolsbrook
 Pottery Primary School, Belper
 Redhill Primary School, Ockbrook
 Renishaw Primary School, Renishaw
 Repton Primary School, Repton
 Richardson Endowed Primary School, Smalley
 Riddings Infant School, Riddings
 Riddings Junior School, Riddings
 Ridgeway Primary School, Ridgeway
 Ripley Infant School, Ripley
 Ripley Junior School, Ripley
 Risley Lower Grammar CE Primary School, Risley
 Rosliston CE Primary School, Rosliston
 Rowsley CE Primary School, Rowsley
 St Andrew's CE Junior School, Hadfield
 St Andrew's CE Methodist Primary School, Dronfield Woodhouse
 St Andrew's CE Primary School, Stanley
 St Anne's CE Primary School, Baslow
 St Anne's RC Academy, Buxton
 St Charles' RC Primary Academy, Hadfield
 St Edward's RC Academy, Swadlincote
 St Elizabeth's RC Academy, Belper
 St George's CE Primary School, Church Gresley
 St George's CE Primary School, New Mills
 St Giles CE Primary School, Killamarsh
 St Giles CE Primary School, Matlock
 St John's CE Primary School, Belper
 St John's CE Primary School, Ripley
 St Joseph's RC Academy, Matlock
 St Joseph's RC and CE Primary School, Staveley
 St Joseph's RC Primary School, Langwith Junction
 St Laurence CE Primary School, Long Eaton
 St Luke's CE Primary School, Glossop
 St Margaret's RC Academy, Glossop
 St Mary's RC Academy, Glossop
 St Mary's RC Academy, New Mills
 St Mary's RC Primary School, Chesterfield
 St Oswald's CE Primary School, Ashbourne
 St Thomas RC Academy, Ilkeston
 Sale and Davys CE Primary School, Barrow upon Trent
 Sawley Infant School, Sawley
 Sawley Junior School, Sawley
 Scarcliffe Primary School, Scarcliffe
 Scargill CE Primary School, West Hallam
 Shardlow Primary School, Shardlow
 Sharley Park Primary School, Danesmoor
 Shirland Primary School, Shirland
 Simmondley Primary School, Simmondley
 Somercotes Infant School, Somercotes
 Somerlea Park Junior School, Somercotes
 South Darley CE Primary School, South Darley
 South Wingfield Primary School, South Wingfield
 Speedwell Infant School, Staveley
 Spire Junior School, Chesterfield
 Spire Infant School, Chesterfield
 Springfield Junior School, Swadlincote
 Stanley Common CE Primary School, Stanley Common
 Stanton Primary School, Stanton
 Stanton-in-Peak CE Primary School, Stanton-in-Peak
 Staveley Junior School, Staveley
 Stenson Fields Primary Community School, Stenson Fields
 Stonebroom Primary School, Stonebroom
 Stoney Middleton CE Primary School, Stoney Middleton
 Street Lane Primary School, Denby
 Stretton Handley CE Primary School, Woolley Moor
 Sudbury Primary School, Sudbury
 Swanwick Primary School, Swanwick
 Taddington and Priestcliffe School, Taddington
 Tansley Primary School, Tansley
 Taxal and Fernilee CE Primary School, Whaley Bridge
 Temple Normanton Junior Academy, Temple Normanton
 Thornsett Primary School, Birch Vale
 Tibshelf Infant School, Tibshelf
 Tintwistle CE Primary School, Tintwistle
 Town End Junior School, Tibshelf
 Tupton Primary Academy, New Tupton
 Turnditch CE Primary School, Turnditch
 Unstone Junior School, Unstone
 Unstone St Mary's Infant School, Unstone
 Waingroves Primary School, Ripley
 Walton Holymoorside Primary School, Holymoorside
 Walton On Trent CE Primary School, Walton-on-Trent
 Wessington Primary School, Wessington
 Westfield Infant School, Brampton
 Westhouses Primary School, Westhouses
 Weston-on-Trent CE Primary School, Weston-on-Trent
 Whaley Bridge Primary School, Whaley Bridge
 Whaley Thorns Primary School, Langwith
 Whitecotes Primary School, Chesterfield
 Whitfield St James' CE Primary School, Glossop
 Whittington Green School, Old Whittington
 Whitwell Primary School, Whitwell
 Wigley Primary School, Wigley
 William Gilbert Endowed CE Primary School, Duffield
 William Levick Primary School, Dronfield Woodhouse
 William Rhodes Primary School, Boythorpe
 Willington Primary School, Willington
 Winster CE Primary School, Winster
 Wirksworth CE Infant School, Wirksworth
 Wirksworth Infant School, Wirksworth
 Wirksworth Junior School, Wirksworth
 Woodbridge Junior School, Alfreton
 Woodthorpe CE Primary School, Woodthorpe
 Woodville CE Junior School, Woodville
 Woodville Infant School, Woodville
 Youlgrave All Saints' CE Primary School, Youlgrave

Secondary schools

 Aldercar High School, Aldercar
 Anthony Gell School, Wirksworth
 Belper School, Belper
 The Bolsover School, Bolsover
 Brookfield Community School, Chesterfield
 Buxton Community School, Buxton
 Chapel-en-le-Frith High School, Chapel-en-le-Frith
 David Nieper Academy, Amber Valley
 Dronfield Henry Fanshawe School, Dronfield
 The Ecclesbourne School, Belper
 Eckington School, Eckington
 Frederick Gent School, South Normanton
 Friesland School, Sandiacre
 Glossopdale School, Hadfield
 Granville Academy, Swadlincote
 Heanor Gate Science College, Heanor
 Heritage High School, Clowne
 Highfields School, Matlock
 Hope Valley College, Hope Valley
 John Flamsteed Community School, Derby
 John Port Spencer Academy, Etwall
 Kirk Hallam Community Academy, Ilkeston
 Lady Manners School, Bakewell
 The Long Eaton School, Long Eaton
 Netherthorpe School, Staveley
 New Mills School, New Mills
 Ormiston Ilkeston Enterprise Academy, Ilkeston
 Outwood Academy Hasland Hall, Chesterfield
 Outwood Academy Newbold, Newbold
 Parkside Community School, Chesterfield
 The Pingle Academy, Swadlincote
 Queen Elizabeth's Grammar School, Ashbourne
 The Ripley Academy, Ripley
 St John Houghton Catholic Voluntary Academy, Kirk Hallam
 St Mary's Roman Catholic High School, Chesterfield
 St Philip Howard Catholic Voluntary Academy, Glossop
 St Thomas More Catholic School, Buxton
 Shirebrook Academy, Shirebrook
 Springwell Community College, Staveley
 Swanwick Hall School, Alfreton
 Tibshelf Community School, Tibshelf
 Tupton Hall School, Chesterfield
 Whittington Green School, Old Whittington
 William Allitt Academy, Swadlincote
 Wilsthorpe School, Long Eaton

Special and alternative schools

Alfreton Park Community Special School, Alfreton
Ashgate Croft School, Chesterfield
Bennerley Fields School, Cotmanhay
Brackenfield Special School, Long Eaton
Holbrook School for Autism, Holbrook
Holly House Special School, Old Whittington
North East Derbyshire Support Centre, Hasland
Peak School, Cauldwell
South Derbyshire Support Centre, Newhall
Stanton Vale School, Long Eaton
Stubbin Wood School, Shirebrook
Swanwick School and Sports College, Swanwick

Further education
 Buxton & Leek College, Buxton
 Chesterfield College, Chesterfield
 Derby College, Ilkeston / Morley

Independent schools

Primary and preparatory schools
 Barlborough Hall School, Barlborough
 Dame Catherine Harpur's School, Ticknall
 Repton Prep, Foremark
 St Peter and St Paul School, Chesterfield
 St Wystan's School, Repton
 Watchorn Christian School, Alfreton

Senior and all-through schools
 Abbotsholme School, Thurvaston
 Mount St Mary's College, Spinkhill
 OneSchool Global UK, Long Eaton
 Repton School, Repton
 St Anselm's School, Bakewell
 Trent College, Long Eaton

Special and alternative schools

 Alderwasley Hall School, Alderwasley
 Arnfield Independent School, Tintwistle
 Bladon House School, Newton Solney
 Bradshaw Farm Independent School, Quarnford
 Eastwood Grange School, Ashover
 Ellern Mede Derby School, Breaston
 High Grange School, Burnaston
 Jasmine House School, Heanor
 The Linnet Independent Learning Centre, Castle Gresley
 Longdon Park School, Egginton
 The Meadows, Dove Holes
 New Direction, Clowne
 Old Sams Farm Independent School, Quarnford
 Pegasus School, Cauldwell
 REAL Independent Schools, Ilkeston

Derbyshire
Schools in Derbyshire
Lists of buildings and structures in Derbyshire